Cantabria Bisons is an American football team based in Santander, Spain.

The Bisons compete in LNFA Serie B, the second-tier division of American football in Spain.

Season to season

External links
Official website

American football teams established in 2011
2011 establishments in Spain
American football teams in Spain
Sports teams in Cantabria
Sport in Santander, Spain